Pythian Services Inc., commonly known as Pythian, is an American and Canadian multinational corporation that provides data and cloud-related services. The company provides services for Oracle, SQL Server, MySQL, Hadoop, Cassandra and other databases and their supporting infrastructure. It also provides transformation services that include cloud migration services, cloud managed services and analytics data platform design and management products and services. Pythian has partnerships with major public cloud vendors including Amazon, Google and Microsoft.

They are a Google Cloud Premier Partner and also a Google MSP Partner. They are also a Microsoft Gold Partner and hold a number of competency accreditations from Microsoft. Pythian is also listed as an AWS Partner Network Advanced Consulting Partner.

History
The company is based in Ottawa, Ontario, and has offices in New York City, London, and Hyderabad, India.

Founded by Paul Vallée in 1997, the company employs approximately 400 employees. In 2014 they acquired Blackbird.io, which was formerly PalominoDB and DriveDev. In 2019 Pythian was acquired by Mill Point Capital, a middle-market private equity firm focused on control-oriented investments in North American IT services, business services, and industrial companies.

Between 2017 and 2018, Pythian's senior management voiced their support for an Ontario pay initiative. The basic income was canceled by newly elected Doug Ford in 2018. Paul Vallée co-authored a letter from 100 leading CEO's in the area, asking for the basic income to be reintroduced.

Products and services
Pythian is the creator of Adminiscope, a privileged access-management and supervision product named in Database Trends and Applications Magazine's Trend-Setting Products for both 2014 and 2015. Adminiscope permits service providers that deliver their services remotely an additional differentiator and revenue stream by offering its security, audit and replay features to customers.

Blackbird is a wholly owned subsidiary of The Pythian Group, following its acquisition in 2014. The DevOps and data services provider acquisition meant that Pythian was one of the largest open-sourced database, managed-service companies globally.

In 2018, Pythian announced they were launching Tehama, a new SaaS product. The software enables corporations to securely manage third-party vendors and freelancers and also integrate them into the corporation's working environment. It targets common problems such as secure outbound connectivity, mailing out laptops or monitoring work activity. The SaaS product was formed as a subsidiary startup of The Pythian Group.

In 2019, Pythian Services was acquired by NYC based private equity firm Mill Point Capital. MPC invested in organic and inorganic growth as well as IP and GTM.  In 2020, Pythian purchased Agosto. Agosto is a Minneapolis-based Google Cloud reseller and IT service management company specializing in IoT. In 2021, Pythian acquired ManageServe, a Chicago-based SAP managed & professional services company.

Awards and recognition
Pythian was named in Canada's Top Small and Medium Employers of 2015. In 2013 and 2014 they received the Global Outsourcing 100 Rising Star by the International Association of Outsourcing Professionals.

Pythian was ranked 91st on the Branham Group Inc's list of 2015 Top 250 Canadian ICT Companies.

Pythian received the 2018 Google Cloud Global Data Analytics Partner of the Year award.

References

International information technology consulting firms
ICT service providers
Technology companies established in 1997
Outsourcing companies